Giovanni Proietti (born 26 June 1977) is an Italian football goalkeeper who plays for YF Juventus in the Swiss 1. Liga Promotion (third tier).

He previously played for Lucchese in Serie B, for Lodigiani and Catania in Serie C1, for Arezzo in Serie B, for Viterbese and Gela in Serie C2, for Lugano and Wohlen in the Swiss Challenge League and for Buochs in the Swiss lower divisions.

References

1977 births
Living people
Footballers from Rome
Italian footballers
Association football goalkeepers
S.S.D. Lucchese 1905 players
A.S. Lodigiani players
A.C. Perugia Calcio players
Catania S.S.D. players
S.S. Arezzo players
U.S. Viterbese 1908 players
S.S.D. Città di Gela players
FC Lugano players
FC Wohlen players
SC Young Fellows Juventus players
Serie B players
Swiss Challenge League players
Expatriate footballers in Switzerland
Italian expatriate sportspeople in Switzerland